King Sheng of Chu (died 402 BC) was the king of the state of Chu from 407 BC to 402 BC  during the early Warring States period of ancient China. He was born Xiong Dang and King Sheng was his posthumous title.

King Sheng succeeded his father King Jian of Chu, who died in 408 BC. After a reign of six years, bandits killed him; his son, King Dao of Chu, succeeded him.

References

Monarchs of Chu (state)
Chinese kings
5th-century BC Chinese monarchs
402 BC deaths
Year of birth unknown
5th-century BC murdered monarchs
Assassinated Chinese politicians